Charpeney Lake is the main body of fresh water at the head of the Saint-Jean North-East River (slope of the Saint-Jean River), flowing in the unorganized territory of Lac-Jérôme, in the Minganie Regional County Municipality, in the administrative region of Côte-Nord, in the province of Quebec, in Canada.

Geography 
This lake between the mountains, in the unorganized territory of Lac-Jérôme, has two parts separated from each other by the Kauapauakaht Pass. This lake is fed in particular by five discharges (coming from the east) of streams, by the discharge (coming from the south) of the Fauteux lake.

The mouth of Lake Charpeney is located at:
  southeast of the boundary between Labrador and Quebec;
  north of the mouth of the Rivière Saint-Jean Nord-Est;
  southwest of a curve in the La Romaine River;
  north-west of downtown Havre-Saint-Pierre.

Lake Charpeney flows into its northeastern part.

Toponymy 
The term "Charpeney" and its variant "Charpenay" turn out to be a French family name. There is a Charpeney township on the North Shore, in Quebec.

The toponym "Lac Charpeney" was formalized on December 5, 1968, by the Commission de toponymie du Québec, that is to say with the creation of this commission.

References

See also 
 Saint-Jean North-East River, a stream
 Minganie Regional County Municipality
 Lac-Jérôme, a Unorganized territory (Canada)
 List of lakes in Canada

External links 
 

Lakes of Côte-Nord
Minganie Regional County Municipality